Somebody is a South Korean streaming television series directed by Jung Ji-woo, written by Jung Ji-woo and Han Ji-wan, and starring Kim Young-kwang, Kang Hae-rim, Kim Yong-ji, and Kim Soo-yeon. It premiered on Netflix on November 18, 2022.

Synopsis 
Kim Sum (Kang Hae-lim) is a developer for social connecting app "Somebody." Even though she has difficulty communicating with other people, she is friends with Mok-won (Kim Yong-ji) and Ki-eun (Kim Soo-yeon). Her friend Ki-eun works as a detective.

A murder takes place and the app "Somebody" is involved in the murder case. Architectural designer Sung Yun-oh (Kim Young-Kwang) appears in front of Sum and her friends. Yun-oh is an attractive man, but he seems to be hiding something. Meanwhile, Ki-eun investigates the murder case with help of Mok-won.

Cast

Main 
 Kim Young-kwang as Sung Yun-oh
 An architectural designer and a psychopathic killer with mixed extreme personalities but does not reveal his true feelings. He begins to reveal his hidden true self when he meets Sum.
 Kang Hae-lim as Kim Sum
 A developer of the Somebody app. She has extraordinary talent enough to develop an artificial intelligence chatting program and social connecting. She has Asperger syndrome.
 Kim Yong-ji as Im Mok-won
 A shaman who is friends with Sum and Gi-eun.
 Kim Su-yeon as Yeong Gi-eun
 Sum's best friend of 10 years and a police officer who tracks down a mysterious case involving Somebody. She has Paraplegia and requires to be on a wheelchair wherever she moves.

Supporting 
 Bae Kang-hee as Lee Ha-in
 A co-worker and Spectrum server manager.
 Choi Yu-ha as Samantha Jung
 The representative of Spectrum, a service provider for Somebody app.
 Choi Sang-hyuk as Shim Woo-cheol
 Choo Sun-woo as Jang Ha-na
 Song Yeon-ji as Rose
 Shin Moon-sung as Min Gi-ung
 A professor.
 Kang Ji-eun as Hong Gong-joo
 Kim Joong-ki as Kim Eun-pyeong
 A detective police officer.
 Shim Woo-sung as Oh Bool-gwang
 A detective police officer.

Special appearances 
 Choi Jae-hoon as Mr. Jung (Episodes 1 and 7)
 Park Yoon-hee as Director of design office. (Episode 2)
 Kim Na-yeon as Oh Na-eun (Episode 2)
 Lee Ki-chan as 79NewMoney
 A rich great land owner. (Episode 3)
 Won Choon-gyu as a merchants' association chairman. (Episode 3)
 Kim Keun-soon as a merchants' association chairman. (Episode 3)
 Seo Kwang-jae as a merchants' association chairman. (Episode 3)
 Lee Ji-ha as Kim Sum's mother. (Episode 4)
 Park So-eul as young Kim Sum (Episode 4)
 Kim Byung-man as a hoody man. (Episode 4)
 Choi Rak-yeong as a hoody man. (Episode 4)
 Lee Eun-woo as Foxy (Episodes 7 and 8)
 Kim Ho as a taxi driver. (Episode 8)

References

External links 
 
 
 

Korean-language Netflix original programming
South Korean thriller television series
South Korean melodrama television series
South Korean crime television series
2022 South Korean television series debuts
2022 web series debuts
2022 South Korean television series endings
South Korean drama web series
South Korean LGBT-related television shows
Television series about social media